The women's pole vault event at the 2013 Summer Universiade was held on 10 July.

Results

References 
Results

Pole
2013 in women's athletics
2013